Southend United F.C. is a professional football club formed in 1906 and based in Southend-on-Sea. Initially playing in the Southern League, the club joined the Football League in 1920 and has competed in the third tier of English football for most subsequent seasons. By 2009 the club had major financial difficulties but avoided administration on several occasions.

History

1906–1958

Southend United F.C. was formed in 1906 and played in the Southern League until 1920, when they co-founded the Football League's new Third Division; they finished 17th in their first ever season. In 1921, the Third Division was regionalised with Southend United joining the southern section and here they remained until league re-structure in 1958. Southend came close to promotion twice when they finished 3rd in 1932 and 1950, the club's highest league positions until 1991.

1958–1981

Southend United joined the new national Third Division in 1958, where they remained until 1966 when they suffered their first ever relegation, into the Fourth Division. The club had to wait six seasons until 1972 to experience the club's first ever promotion as runners-up behind Grimsby Town. In 1976 Southend suffered relegation again before taking another runners-up spot behind Watford in 1978. Another relegation in 1980 was directly followed by one of the most successful seasons in the club's history as they won the Fourth Division Championship in 1981, breaking a series of club records in the process. Despite success on the pitch and low admission prices, the club's gates were low and condemned as "a bad reflection on the town".

1981–1987

Many of Southend United's most gifted players were sold due to a financial strain. In June 1983 Anton Johnson, a local butcher who was also chairman of Rotherham United, bought 44.9% of the club from the Rubin brothers. The club was already £250,000 in debt. By August 1983 Dave Smith had been replaced as manager by Peter Morris who lasted until February 1984. On his arrival, Morris discovered that he had a squad of only ten players. Bobby Moore was installed as chief executive with Andrew MacHutcheon as chairman. The club were relegated into the Fourth Division in 1984 with Bobby Moore as manager. One of the club's darkest hours saw a season average attendance of barely above 2,000. Vic Jobson was elected as a director in the 1984 close-season, only to be forced out, along with MacHutcheon, months later. On the pitch, the team finished in 20th place, narrowly avoiding the need to seek re-election to the Football League.

Johnson was arrested on 23 October 1984. Two weeks before Christmas, fans discovered that £70,000 of the club's Christmas savings scheme had gone missing. While the fraud squad investigated, Robert Maxwell and Ken Bates stepped in, at Jobson's request, to lend the necessary money to the club to repay its Christmas savers. The club was now over £800,000 in debt.  Johnson was banned by the FA from any future involvement in football, having simultaneously been in control of Southend, Rotherham and Bournemouth. Johnson was cleared of all charges at Chelmsford Crown Court and has never received the monies he personally invested in the misplaced Christmas fund and lost his shares in a further court case to the SUFC board. Over a decade later, Ceefax reported that Johnson was seeking to take over Doncaster Rovers.

1987–1992

Promotion in 1987 was the beginning of a golden era for Southend United. Relegation in 1989 was a mere blip as two successive promotions in 1990 and 1991 saw Southend United become "full members" of the Football League for the first time in the club's history, and in 1992 Southend United finished 12th in the old Second Division, their highest ever position in the Football League to date. On New Year's Day, 1992, the club briefly topped the Second Division but their dreary late season form stopped any hopes of a unique third successive promotion that would have given them a place as a Premier League founder member. Manager David Webb then stepped down.

1992–2003
Southend United were managed by Colin Murphy, Barry Fry and then Peter Taylor over the next three seasons. In 1995, former Liverpool player Ronnie Whelan agreed to become player-manager, and Southend finished 14th in Division One in his first season as a manager, a year later the club suffered relegation after finishing bottom of Division One. Ronnie Whelan left the club, claiming a lack of support from the fans and a lack of money from the chairman. Subsequently, Whelan won a case for wrongful dismissal.

Alvin Martin was named Whelan's replacement. Martin was unable to avoid a second consecutive relegation which Southend once again finishing bottom of the table and were duly relegated to Division Three. First team regulars Simon Royce, Jeroen Boere, Andy Thomson and Andy Rammell all left the club and were replaced by Martyn Margetson, Mark Beard, Mark Stimson and Rob Newman. Alvin Martin left in April 1999, with Southend fifth from bottom in the Football League.

Alan Little took charge of his first game away to Leyton Orient, a game Southend lost 3–0. Alan Little, who had previously managed York City, signed former York City players Mark Tinkler and Martin Curruthers. With limited success gates were barely getting above the 3,000 mark and a crowd of only 2,403 showed up to watch the game against Kidderminster and Alan Little's reign had come to an end.

David Webb left Yeovil Town and was appointed the new manager, signing players Darryl Flahavan, Leon Cort, Tes Bramble and Mark Rawle. During the season David Webb became ill and Rob Newman took temporary charge, being appointed permanently when Webb quit the club. Southend suffered straight defeats to Lincoln, Swansea, Kidderminster and Hartlepool, and Newman was dismissed shortly after.  Steve Wignall took over as manager and signed Drewe Broughton, Mark Gower, Mark Warren and Che Wilson. He released goalkeeper Darryl Flahavan after he deemed him too small to play in the League, but re-signed him after a poor run of results.  Two more defeats followed and Wignall was sacked. In late 2003 former Southend United midfielder Steve Tilson was appointed manager and named former Leyton Orient boss Paul Brush as his assistant.

2003–2006

Southend reached their first ever national cup final in 2004 when they met Blackpool in the final of the LDV Vans Trophy at the Millennium Stadium in Cardiff. Over 20,000 Southend fans travelled, but the team did not rise to the occasion and Blackpool won 2–0.

In 2004 Tilson and Brush were installed as a permanent management / coaching duo and led Southend to promotion to League 1 in 2005, while making a second successive appearance in the Football League Trophy final, which the Shrimpers lost 2–0 to Wrexham, but the third appearance at the Millennium Stadium in the League Two play-off final against Lincoln City brought success as Freddy Eastwood and Duncan Jupp scored the goals that gave the club their first ever taste of promotion via the play-off system and their first major piece of silverware since 1981.

2006–2010
On 29 April 2006 the Shrimpers were promoted to the Football League Championship after a 2–2 draw with Swansea City at the Welsh club's new Liberty Stadium. Southend were crowned League One champions on 6 May 2006 after beating Bristol City 1–0 at Roots Hall in front of over 11,000 fans.  This was the last professional appearance of Shaun Goater; fans from his former club Manchester City came to give him a special send-off at the end of a long and distinguished career. For Southend United, the title was the club's first in 25 years. On 6 May 2006 Tilson was named as the League Manager Association's Manager-of-the-Season for League One.

Southend started the 2006–07 season reasonably well, beating Stoke City 1–0 on the opening day and a few games later Sunderland 3–1.  Southend then did not win a league game for 18 games until 9 December 2006 when they beat Southampton 2–1 and West Bromwich Albion 3–1.  On New Year's Day 2007, Southend picked up their first away victory of the season over Cardiff City, followed by a 3–1 victory away to Birmingham City on 31 January 2007 which lifted the Shrimpers from the bottom of the division on goal difference. On 9 February 2007 the Shrimpers defeated Queens Park Rangers 5–0 – a disastrous return for Southend's former goalkeeper Simon Royce.  Southend escaped the relegation zone on 13 March 2007 when the Blues gained a 1–0 victory over Burnley.  But after a 3–0 home defeat to rivals Colchester and only 10 league wins in the season, the Shrimpers were relegated back to League One.

On their return to League One Southend had bolstered their squad, adding Striker Charlie MacDonald, Winger Tommy Black and centre midfielder Nicky Bailey to their ranks. Despite the sale of Freddy Eastwood, Southend finished sixth in League One at the end of 2007–08 much to the thanks Lee Barnard, a January signing from Tottenham Hotspur, scoring 9 goals in 13 games, thus qualifying for a play-off place against Doncaster Rovers. Southend drew the home leg 0–0, but lost the second leg 5–1.

Following the play off defeat to Doncaster Rovers manager Steve Tilson began a mass summer clear out when Goalkeeper Steve Collis, Defender Lewis Hunt, Winger Tommy Black and club captain and loyal servant for over 10 years Kevin Maher were all released. Forwards Matt Harrold, Charlie MacDonald, Gary Hooper and Richie Foran were transfer listed. Darryl Flahavan and Mark Gower both turned down new contracts to sign for Championship sides Crystal Palace and Swansea City respectively. Simon Francis, Peter Clarke and Nicky Bailey were also later placed on the transfer list after failing to agree new contracts at the club. Francis later agreed and signed a new two-year deal. Bailey was being chased by Championship side Charlton Athletic, Bailey put in a man of the match display on Southend's opening game of the season against Peterborough United which was being watched by the London club, the game proved to be Bailey's last for Southend and signed for Charlton 3 days later for £500,000 which could rise to £750,000. Peter Clarke remained on the transfer list for the entire season stating that he "never wanted to leave and never asked to be transfer listed" but wanted to concentrate on his football and discuss his future at the end of the season.

Southend pulled off the shock of the summer transfer market with the deadline day signing of Crystal Palace legend Dougie Freedman, the Scotsman signed a two-year contract at Roots Hall just minutes before the window shut. Manager Steve Tilson was delighted to bring Freedman to Roots Hall adding some much needed experience to Southend's forward line, something The Blues had been without since the retirement of Shaun Goater. Tilson also signed goalkeeper Steve Mildenhall from Yeovil Town as his new number one following the departure of Darryl Flahavan and the shot stopper has become a firm favourite with the Southend fans. With Kevin Maher's departure Adam Barrett was officially named new club captain. Southend ended the season well with a run of just one defeat in nine games in February and March, that form was much down to two loan signings. Theo Robinson, a striker who signed until the end of the season from Championship side Watford and France U21 centre back Dorian Dervite signed from Tottenham Hotspur also until the end of the season and were both influential in Southend's late surge up the League One table. Despite this good form Southend unfortunately just missed out on a play off place with an eighth-place finish. Peter Clarke, who had remained on the transfer list for the entire season won the club's player of the season award before leaving the club and signed a three-year deal with League One rivals Huddersfield Town. Clarke admitted that he was leaving with a heavy heart and his time at Southend at been an enjoyable one, thanking the fans and management for their support.

The following day former manager David Webb was installed as Steve Tilson's new assistant.  Webb stated that his role is only until the end of the 2009/10 season.

A dismal run of just one win in 2010 left Southend deep in trouble at the wrong end of the table, relegation was confirmed on 24 April 2010 away to Oldham despite twice coming from behind to earn a 2–2 draw it was not enough and Southend's fate was sealed.

Southend were relegated to League Two following a 2–2 draw with Oldham Athletic and with League Two having a salary cap that would mean the high earners at the club leaving. Player of the season Simon Francis and goalkeeper Steve Mildenhall were placed on the transfer list, Francis was given permission to speak to League One side Brentford but he failed to agree terms. Winger Damian Scannell turned down a new deal to sign a two-year deal with Dagenham & Redbridge.

Club captain Adam Barrett and vice captain Alan McCormack both had their contracts terminated by mutual consent.

McCormack made a short switch to London signing a two-year contract with Charlton Athletic. Barrett later joined Championship side Crystal Palace where he linked up with former Southend coach Dean Austin and former Southend striker Dougie Freedman who is now assistant manager at Selhurst Park.

On 4 July 2010 manager Steve Tilson was put on gardening leave, ending his seven-year stint as manager. Chairman Ron Martin stated that he didn't see the fight from the players or the manager.

Cup successes

V. Manchester United
Southend beat Leeds United in the third round of the League Cup and the draw for the fourth round set up a home tie against trophy holders and Premier League Champions Manchester United on 7 November 2006. The away side fielded a strong team, which included 10 players capped at international level. Cristiano Ronaldo and Wayne Rooney were amongst the starting line up, along with Gabriel Heinze, Darren Fletcher, Wes Brown and Alan Smith. Southend had injuries to strikers Billy Paynter and Lee Bradbury while Matt Harrold was cup tied so boss Steve Tilson partnered Gary Hooper up front with Freddy Eastwood. After 25 minutes Jamal Campbell-Ryce was fouled by David Jones 30 yards from goal, Kevin Maher, Steven Hammell and Freddy Eastwood stood over the free kick, Eastwood curled "a wonderful free-kick around the wall and into the top corner past Tomasz Kuszczak" as the BBC reported. Southend held on for one of the most famous victories in the club's history. Since this was the only meeting between the two sides to date, Southend are one of the only sides to have a 100% record against the Red Devils (along with Zenit St Petersburg, Vasco de Gama and Bootle Reserves). The latter defeated Newton Heath, the original name of Manchester United, in the 1890/91 FA Cup 2nd qualifying round.

V. Tottenham Hotspur
On Wednesday 20 December 2006 Southend travelled to White Hart Lane to face Tottenham Hotspur in the quarter final of the League Cup, Southend put in a brave performance and with neither goalkeeper really tested the game went to extra time. Jermain Defoe scored the only goal of the game in the 119th minute which video replays showed was in fact offside.

After seeing off Barnsley in the FA Cup Southend were once again drawn away to Spurs on 27 January 2007. Robbie Keane gave the hosts the lead after 13 minutes which looked to be the start of a rout, Southend defended well and were able to see out the half still only the one goal down. Jermaine Jenas added a 2nd for Spurs shortly after the interval. Southend were given a life line and a route back into the game when a Matt Harrold shot was handled in the area by Hossam Ghaly, Freddy Eastwood stepped up to take the spot kick and confidently sent Radek Cerny the wrong way. Southend's hopes of an unlikely comeback were put to bed just 5 minutes later when Mido restored Spurs 2 goal advantage. Gary Hooper had a good chance to pull a goal back for Southend in injury time after lifting the ball over the goalkeeper but also over the crossbar.

V. Chelsea

On 3 January 2009, Southend drew 1–1 against Chelsea at Stamford Bridge in the third round of the FA Cup.
 Chelsea included Frank Lampard, Joe Cole and Didier Drogba in their starting line up. The Premiership side had the best of the opening exchanges and had a great chance to take the lead when Didier Drogba was one-on-one with goalkeeper Steve Mildenhall before Osei Sankofa slid in to take the ball off Drogba's toes as he was winding up the shot. Southend's resistance was broken just passed the half hour mark when Salomon Kalou headed in from a Frank Lampard corner. Drogba could have extended Chelsea's lead before the interval but Steve Mildenhall saved. Peter Clarke nearly drew Southend level with 10 minutes remaining after seeing his header come back off the bar, Clarke was not to be denied a second time and in the 1st minute of injury time a Johnny Herd long throw was directed by Ricardo Carvalho straight into the path of Clarke who headed in the equaliser on his 27th birthday.

The replay was scheduled for 14 January 2009 but was called off by the referee, Chris Foy, who had made the decision due to poor visibility caused by fog. Mr. Foy then reversed his decision after the fog suddenly lifted and visibility improved and the game went ahead but kick off was delayed by 15 minutes. Southend's Alan McCormack missed the replay through suspension after picking up his fifth yellow card of the season at Stamford Bridge. The suspension would have been in effect for Southend's home game against Crewe Alexandra which had been expected to take place on 10 January 2009 but fell foul of the weather. Chelsea won 4–1.

HMRC and administration fears (2009-10)

In October 2009 Southend faced a winding up order from HM Revenue & Customs over an unpaid tax bill of £690,000. The club were also hit with a transfer embargo, this left Steve Tilson with just 12 fit professionals due to injuries and suspensions to his already threadbare squad. George Friend, who was on loan with Southend from Wolves before the embargo was in place, was unable to have his loan extended, despite an agreement between the two clubs for the left back to stay at Roots Hall.

On 27 October 2009 Southend avoided the prospect of a winding up order but the club could still have fallen into administration, acquiring an automatic 10 point deduction so every point on the field was vital. Southend beat Gillingham 1–0 on 30 October with Lee Barnard scoring the winning goal in the 3rd minute of injury time. Southend avoided going into administration on 9 November having paid the outstanding tax bill of £2.135 million on 6 November. The Guardian reported "A previous high court hearing was told that HMRC originally presented a winding-up petition for a tax bill of £690,000, but applied to have the club put into administration when the debt became larger." On 12 December 2009 the transfer embargo was lifted.

On 10 February 2010 Southend were back in court for another unpaid tax bill, this time £205,000. Southend chairman Ron Martin claimed that he was refusing to pay because the initial tax bill of £2.1 million was overpaid, the winding up petition was adjourned for 28 days. On 9 March 2010 Southend confirmed that the players had not yet been paid for and February and the PFA had to pay the players for January, the club were placed under another transfer embargo until they paid the money back. On 10 March 2010 Southend were given a 35-day extension to pay the unpaid bill or face administration.

On 14 April 2010, Southend were granted a final seven days to pay the outstanding bill. On 20 April 2010 the fee of £378,500 was paid.

On 2 August 2010 all cases against Southend United were dropped and an agreement was reached with HMRC. Southend's transfer embargo was lifted later that week.

2010–13
On 5 July 2010 former Sheffield Wednesday and Plymouth Argyle manager, Paul Sturrock was announced as the new manager with Tommy Widdrington as his assistant. Sturrock's first signings for Southend were former Northampton Town left back Peter Gilbert and striker Barry Corr who was released by Exeter City. Both players had played under Sturrock previously. Southend being under a transfer embargo both players could only sign pre contract agreements.

A squad of 17 players were only registered in time to play on the eve of the new season as the club's transfer embargo was lifted. Sturrock led Southend to a respectable 13th-placed finish in his first season.  The club mounted a more serious challenge the following season, spending 11 weeks at the top of League 2, owing to the goals and form of Ryan Hall, Kane Ferdinand and Liam Dickinson. A subsequent decline in form meant the team had to enter the play-offs after finishing the season in 4th place with 83 points, a total that in any other year in League 2, would have won the league. Southend lost the play off semi-final against Crewe Alexandra 3–2 on aggregate.

A transfer embargo at the start of the 2012–13 season meant that the club started its campaign with a depleted squad.  The loan signing of Britt Assombalonga from Watford proved a success as the youngster scored 12 goals in 18 appearances. Blues went on a run of 14 games unbeaten which saw them reach 4th in the table. At the turn of the year Southend's form dramatically dropped, although the club reached its first ever Wembley cup final in the Football League Trophy. Paul Sturrock was sacked 2 weeks before the cup final but was controversially asked to manage the team for the final. Sturrock refused and watched the game from the stand. The Blues took a record 33,000 fans to the match, but lost 2–0 to Crewe Alexandra.

Phil Brown was brought in as Sturrock's successor but picked up just one win in his eight games in charge as Southend finished the season in 11th position, with only six league wins at Roots Hall all season, a worse home record than Barnet and Aldershot who were relegated.

2013–present
Brown brought in former Darlington Manager Dave Penney as his assistant, whilst retaining Graham Coughlan as first team coach. Bob Shaw was also brought in as Head of Scouting and Recruitment. Brown's first summer signing was full back John White who had been released from neighbours Colchester United. He also signed former Hull City winger Will Atkinson who had left Bradford City. In 2015 Phil Brown led the team after a thrilling play-off final against Wycombe Wanderers (7:6 on Penalties) into League One. At the end of the 2016/2017 season the club missed the play-offs for the Championship by only one point.

2019-2021: Financial difficulties and relegation to National League
On 22 October 2019, Sol Campbell was appointed manager of Southend. Campbell took charge for his first game — a 3–1 home defeat to Ipswich Town — on 25 October. Financial difficulties, including a winding-up petition heard on 22 January 2020, resulted in non-payment of players' and other employees' wages in December 2019, after which players consulted with the PFA. At this point (9 January 2020), Southend were 22nd in League One, 15 points from safety after winning only one of 24 league games. Club chairman Ron Martin paid £140,000 after seven senior Southend United players were not paid their December 2019 wages on time, and met with all players to reassure them it would not happen again. The winding-up petition was dismissed after debts were cleared.

On 18 January 2020, Southend won their first league game under Campbell with a 2–1 victory away at Accrington Stanley, also a first league win since 21 September 2019. However, financial constraints prevented the club signing any new players during the January 2020 transfer window. On 2 March, Martin confirmed Southend was under an EFL transfer embargo due to an unpaid tax bill, while February's wages to players were not paid on time, resulting in further PFA involvement. On 9 March, Southend was charged with misconduct by the EFL for failing to pay players on time, and for fielding an ineligible player against Lincoln City on 1 February (on 2 June, Southend received a suspended three-point penalty and were fined £7,500 for these offences). On 11 March, a further HMRC winding-up petition was adjourned to 29 April; it was then adjourned three more times, eventually to 28 October 2020.

On 2 April 2020, during the COVID-19 pandemic in the United Kingdom, Southend put "several staff and some players" on furlough (temporary leave) under the UK Government's emergency job retention scheme. The club's chairman said "It enables the club to best manage its finances during this time of limited income", but the move was criticised by the PFA who said the club had "consistently" let players down over wages. On 9 June, Football League clubs in Leagues One and Two agreed to end the 2019–20 season; Southend were relegated to League Two. The following day, the club announced it was putting the whole playing squad on furlough, but players refused to accept the move. On 30 June 2020, manager Campbell and three assistants left the club by mutual consent.

On 13 August 2020, Southend United appointed Mark Molesley, formerly manager of Weymouth, as their new manager on a three-year contract. On 28 October 2020, the club finally settled tax debts of £493,931 with HMRC; as a result, a winding-up petition was dismissed by the High Court. On 9 April 2021, Molesley was sacked having only won eight games out of 45; the club were 23rd, five points from safety with six games remaining. Phil Brown returned as manager but could not rescue the situation; Southend suffered a second successive relegation on 1 May 2021 with a game to spare despite a 2–1 victory at Barrow, dropping out of the Football League after 101 years. Brown subsequently agreed a two-year contract to manage the club.

2021-present: Continuing financial difficulties
In April 2021, former Southend player Stan Collymore wrote to Martin offering to buy the club from him, and held talks concerning the potential appointment of a Collymore associate as the club's CEO in May 2021, Tom Lawrence (formerly CEO at Gillingham) was appointed. In August 2021, Southend revealed their overall debt in July 2019 was £17.4m, having grown by £2.4m; Martin said the majority of the debt was owed to his companies, and that £6.8m of debt had already been written off. On 21 August 2021, Southend started their first season in the National League with a 1–0 victory at King's Lynn Town, but a six-match winless streak had manager Phil Brown fearing for his future, describing Southend as stuck in a massive "chasm". On 5 and 9 October 2021, Southend fans staged protests at Roots Hall demanding the departure of chairman Ron Martin; following a 4–0 defeat by Chesterfield at Roots Hall on 9 October, Brown was sacked. Collymore offered further free support to the club, described by the BBC as "a mess" and "already on life support". Defender Jason Demetriou took temporary charge before, on 20 October 2021, Kevin Maher returned to the club as head coach, supported by assistant Darren Currie and Mark Bentley as first team coach. CEO Tom Lawrence also started negotiations with Collymore about a formal role with the club, and he was appointed the club's senior football strategist in early November 2021, with John Still appointed head of football two weeks later. In December 2021, Southend was placed under a National League embargo because of HMRC debts caused by the COVID-19 pandemic; after back-to-back relegations and 18 months of reduced income, CEO Lawrence said the club was "in a deteriorating income position". In May 2022, Southend finished their first National League season in 13th position.

On 30 September 2022, the club was placed under a transfer embargo after a missed payment to HMRC; the following day, fans staged protests at Roots Hall after shirt sponsors PG Site Services withdrew their club support via a Facebook post (later retracted). Fans group Save Our Southend blamed "the utter ineptitude of Ron Martin in running the club properly," judging him "to be an unfit and improper owner". In a statement, Martin blamed a programme delay for a missed payment under the club's Time To Pay Agreement with HMRC, which he said HMRC then cancelled prematurely. He said bridging finance would enable the club to discharge its HMRC debt in full. HMRC issued a winding-up petition; due to be heard at the High Court on 9 November, it was adjourned to 18 January 2023, meaning the transfer embargo remained in place. After members of staff were also reported to be late receiving their October 2022 salaries, the Shrimpers Trust and shirt sponsor PG Site Services each loaned the club £40,000, a gesture described by CEO Tom Lawrence as "humbling". He added: "The way out of the financial issues we are currently facing is to move to Fossetts Farm." November and some December 2022 wages for players and non-playing staff were also paid late (on 29 December 2022, many backroom staff remained unpaid since October). Lawrence said the club had a funding gap of about £2m a year; promotion to League Two would reduce current losses to more manageable levels.

With the club's final accounts for the year to 31 July 2020 still not filed (overdue since April 2021), on 3 January 2023, Companies House issued a first Gazette notice to have the company struck off. On 18 January 2023, the HMRC winding up hearing was adjourned again, until 1 March 2023. In a 25 January 2023 statement, Martin could not "outline precise timings" regarding the bridging finance to be applied against the "large" HMRC debt; Martin was later reported to be seeking a £5m loan to pay debts including £1.4m in unpaid tax owed to HMRC. The Shrimpers Trust did not expect the club to make a loan repayment due at the start of February, and, with players and other staff unpaid for January, anxious fans started planning a 'phoenix club'.

On 10 February 2023, St John Ambulance said it would no longer provide first aid staff at Southend United home games because of outstanding fees, forcing the club to find alternative medical cover ahead of an FA Trophy tie with York City. The following day, Martin said finding the money to clear the club's HMRC debt by 1 March "will be close" but he "will not let the club be wound-up". He described the debt as a legacy of unpaid PAYE for players' wages from when Southend was in Leagues One and Two. Martin said: "Raising the funds is my primary focus. We are advanced but not there yet. Times are tough but I'm not a magician. However, if we get past this current trauma, the future for the club is bright." Players' January wages remained unpaid ahead of Southend's 25 February game at Torquay United, and were eventually paid 28 days late; other staff had not been paid since November. Less than 24 hours before the winding-up hearing, the club said it had paid the £1.4m tax bill owed to HMRC, adding that "funds as working capital" had also been injected into the club; and, after a brief hearing at the Insolvency and Companies Court on 1 March 2023, the winding-up petition was dismissed after HMRC confirmed the debt had been paid. However, the transfer embargo remained in place; sponsors, angry at being kept in the dark, talked of taking legal action against the club; and supporters groups, fearing "the next crisis could be just around the corner", highlighted the "owner's inadequacies" and said a new beginning would only be possible "when a new structure and ownership is in place at the club".

References

Southend United F.C.
Southend United